The Amazon River frog (Lithobates palmipes) is a species of frog in the family Ranidae that occurs in the northern and Amazonian South America east of the Andes (Brazil, Bolivia, Peru, Ecuador, Colombia, Venezuela, Guyana, Suriname, French Guiana, and Trinidad), with scattered records from northeastern Brazil. Its natural habitats are tropical rainforests near permanent waterbodies. It is not considered threatened by the International Union for Conservation of Nature. It is highly appreciated as food by the Ye’kwana of southeastern Venezuela.

References

Further reading

Lithobates
Amphibians of Bolivia
Amphibians of Brazil
Amphibians of Colombia
Amphibians of Ecuador
Amphibians of French Guiana
Amphibians of Guyana
Amphibians of Peru
Amphibians of Suriname
Amphibians of Trinidad and Tobago
Amphibians of Venezuela
Frogs of South America
Amphibians described in 1824
Taxonomy articles created by Polbot